Cheleh or Chelleh may refer to:
Chelleh-ye Olya, Kermanshah Province
Chelleh Darreh
Cheleh Gah (disambiguation), several places
Cheleh Rural District, in Kermanshah Province